This is a list of films which have placed number one at the weekend box office in the United Kingdom during 2019.

Films

Notes

References

External links
Weekend box office figures | BFI

2019
United Kingdom
2019 in British cinema